Russell Perrett (born 18 June 1973) is an English former footballer who spent most of his career with Portsmouth and Luton Town. He started his career in non-league football with Lymington Town in the Wessex League where he holds the record as the youngest player to play in that league at age 14.

Football career
After being released from Portsmouth, where he had completed a two-year apprenticeship, he went back to play for Lymington Town in the Wessex League. He spent four seasons there before undergoing a month-long trial back at Portsmouth and was offered a contract by the then manager, Terry Fenwick. He soon established himself in the first team and was rewarded with a three-year contract. The arrival of Alan Ball, who coincidentally signed Perrett as an apprentice on his first spell at Portsmouth, meant appearances were limited and Cardiff City's manager, Frank Burrows, signed him on a free transfer in 1999.

Burrows left and the arrival of ex-Wimbledon chairman Sam Hammam and manager Bobby Gould meant a total restructure of the club and Perrett was given a free transfer in 2001.

Perrett was signed by Luton Town's manager Joe Kinnear in summer 2001, after spells with AFC Lymington, Portsmouth and Cardiff City. He signed a new one-year deal in February 2007, but was deemed surplus to requirements by the new manager, Kevin Blackwell, and was released in July 2007 after six years at the club, winning one league title and two promotions. He subsequently signed for the League One side AFC Bournemouth on a one-year contract. He chose to retire on 7 May 2008 after suffering a bout of pleurisy which sidelined him for four months of his first season at the club.

References

External links

1973 births
Living people
English footballers
A.F.C. Lymington players
AFC Bournemouth players
Cardiff City F.C. players
Luton Town F.C. players
Portsmouth F.C. players
English Football League players
People from New Milton
Association football defenders
Wessex Football League players